Public Opinion (French: Rumeur publique, Italian: Opinione pubblica) is a 1954 French-Italian drama film directed by Maurizio Corgnati and Goffredo Alessandrini and starring Daniel Gélin,  Delia Scala and Giulio Calì.

Plot 
Following the death of his wife in unclear circumstances, the mechanic Egisto Bianchi is accused of auxoricide. A journalist begins to take care of the case and ignites public interest with a successful press campaign. The accused is acquitted for lack of evidence, but the reporter thinks he can still take advantage of the case by making a film of it. He then convinces some filmmakers to draw from the episode the subject of a film in which Bianchi himself will be the protagonist.

During the filming, the reporter discovers that Bianchi's wife was cheating on her husband. So he then decides to modify the film script, including adultery, and to be able to shoot without problems he makes Bianchi go away. But he returns and, unseen, witnesses the new scenes of the film in the cinema of the country. Bianchi, convinced that adultery is an invention, protests for the change, but the journalist reveals the truth to him, bringing the story to a dramatic ending.

Cast
 Daniel Gélin as Paolo Jaier  
 Delia Scala as Lauretta 
 Giulio Calì 
 Carlo Campanini as Leonide Forgesi, the producer  
 Manfred Freyberger 
 Maria Mauban as Dora Markus  
 Paul Muller as Carlo Leone, the director  
 Renato Salvatori as Mario  
 Massimo Serato as Massimo Gorini  
 Gianrico Tedeschi as Egisto Bianchi  
 Luigi Tosi as Attilio  
 Saro Urzì

References

Bibliography 
 Parish, Robert. Film Actors Guide. Scarecrow Press, 1977.

External links 
 

1954 drama films
French drama films
Italian drama films
1954 films
1950s Italian-language films
Films directed by Goffredo Alessandrini
French black-and-white films
Italian black-and-white films
1950s Italian films
1950s French films